Infinite Search is the debut album by Czech jazz bassist Miroslav Vitouš. It was released in 1970 by Embryo Records. The same album has been released under three different titles. The second is Mountain in the Clouds a later remixed and enhanced version of the same recordings (1972 US edition:Atlantic SD 1622 and 1972 German edition: Atlantic ATL 50 406), featuring one extra track "Cérečka", and the third title is The Bass (1972 German edition: Hörzu Black Label SD 1622) still also with the bonus track "Cérečka".

Reception 
At The Audiophile Man on 25 September 2016, journalist Paul Rigby notes that:

Track listing

Personnel 
Musicians
 Miroslav Vitouš – bass, leader
 Joe Henderson – tenor saxophone
 John McLaughlin – electric guitar
 Herbie Hancock – electric piano
 Jack DeJohnette – drums (all tracks except track #6)
 Joe Chambers – drums (track #6)

Production
 Herbie Mann – producer
 Dave Green – engineer
 Haig Adishian – album design
 Joel Brodsky – photography

References 

1970 albums
Miroslav Vitouš albums